EOI may refer to:

Economics and commerce 
 Economic Opportunity Institute, an American public policy think tank
 Export-oriented industrialization
 Expression of interest

Other uses 
 European Ombudsman Institute
 Belyayev EOI, a Soviet fighter aircraft
 Eday Airport, in Orkney, Scotland 
 EOI Business School, in Spain
 End of interrupt, a computer signal
 Escuela Oficial de Idiomas, a Spanish network of language schools
 Exhaust over intake, a type of combustion engine

See also
 Encyclopaedia of Islam (EI)